James "Roberttown Rocket" Hare (born 16 July 1976 in Dewsbury) is an English amateur feather/lightweight and professional light welter/welter/light middle/middleweight boxer of the 1990s and 2000s who as an amateur was runner-up for the 1991 Amateur Boxing Association of England (ABAE) Junior Class-A featherweight (57 kg) title, against Daniel Happe (Honor Oak ABC), boxing out of Batley ABC, and won the 1992 Amateur Boxing Association of England (ABAE) Junior Class-B lightweight (60 kg) title, against George Robshaw (Dale Youth), boxing out of Batley and Dewsbury ABC, and as a professional won the European Boxing Union (EBU) European Union (EU) welterweight title, World Boxing Federation (WBF) welterweight title, and Commonwealth welterweight title, and was a challenger for the British Boxing Board of Control (BBBofC) British welterweight title against David Barnes, his professional fighting weight varied from , i.e. light welterweight to , i.e. middleweight.

References

External links

Image - James Hare

1976 births
English male boxers
Featherweight boxers
Middleweight boxers
Light-middleweight boxers
Light-welterweight boxers
Lightweight boxers
Living people
Sportspeople from Dewsbury
Welterweight boxers